Newlands Catholic School FCJ, was a mixed 11–16 Catholic, state school in Middlesbrough, North Yorkshire, England. The school was awarded Specialist Maths and Computing College status.

It was owned by a religious order, the Faithful Companions of Jesus (FCJs) who originally came to Middlesbrough in the 19th century at the request of the Bishops. It was originally a girls school before it was amalgamated with St Mary's the local boys school.

The school motto was Fortiter Et Recte, which in Latin means "Bravely and Justly".

In 2009 Newlands School was officially renamed as Trinity Catholic College after amalgamating with St. David's School, Middlesbrough.

References

Defunct Catholic schools in the Diocese of Middlesbrough
Defunct schools in Middlesbrough